Smilin' Jack or Smiling Jack may refer to:

 The Adventures of Smilin' Jack, an American newspaper cartoon strip that ran from 1933 to 1973
 The Adventures of Smilin' Jack (serial), a film serial based on the cartoon strip
 Smilin' Jack Smith (1913–2006), an American singer, radio host, and actor
 John M. Conroy (1920–1979), an American actor, aviator, and businessman, nicknamed "Smiling Jack"
 John Tait (runner) (1888–1971), a Canadian athlete
 John F. Wiley (1920–2013), an American football player and coach, nicknamed "Smiling Jack"

See also
 Happy Jack (disambiguation)

Nicknames